Active Kidz is a series of exercise television programs to encourage children to be more physically active, which was broadcast on the ABC at 4.30 pm weekdays in Australia, it was presented by Scott Ehler and Amy Wilkins. The show was very popular with children throughout Australia and won several awards including Best Music for Children's Television. Scott and Amy provide children with information about staying fit and healthy and present a dance routine which is taught to the audience in each show. The show was picked up on the Disney Channel in Asia where the team had sold-out tours throughout Asia.

The Active Kidz team toured the UK and the US in 2007 and 2008.

A second series was released onto the Nickelodeon and Nick Jr. channels on Australian pay television provider Foxtel in January 2008/2009.  In 2008, following Amy Wilkins moving to a more managerial role due to pregnancy, Dimity Clancey joined the Active Kidz team, featuring in the second television series. Dimi is a journalist, and has toured all over the world with Barney, Hello Kitty and Meow Meow Kapow!

Scott was also Fitness Professional of NSW and Fitness Professional of Australia.

Active Kidz have an extensive range of DVDs, CDs, board games, clothing and other merchandise.

In 2006 Scott (28) and Amy (26) were named on the 30 under 30 List. Money Magazine reported that the 2 were making $5 million each a year through touring and royalties.

Characters
Scott Ehler – Host/Celebrity Photographer
Amy Wilkins – Host on TV shows
Dimity Clancey – Host
Oprah: Scott and Amy's new dog
Dr Julie on Season 2 shows
The dog: AK 9 used in approximately 1–2 episodes

Awards and nominations

APRA-AGSC Awards
The annual Screen Music Awards are presented by Australasian Performing Right Association (APRA) and Australian Guild of Screen Composers (AGSC) for television and film scores and soundtracks.

|-
| 2004 || Active Kidz – Scott Ehler, Glenn Heaton, Geoffrey McGarvey, Amy Wilkins  || Best Music for Children's Television || 
|-

Notes

References 
Scott Ehler "AK Diary: Welcome Dimi (29 January 2008)" [Online] http://www.activekidz.com.au/index.php?area=diary&v=96 Retrieved 26 July 2008.

External links
 Active Kidz website

APRA Award winners
Australian children's television series
Australian non-fiction television series
Australian Broadcasting Corporation original programming
2000s Australian television series